Mihal Zallari (25 September 1894 – 17 March 1976) was an Albanian historian, politician, journalist and poet. He served as Chairman of the National Parliament of Albania from 1943 to 1944.

Life 
Born in Frashër on 25 September 1894, he hailed from the Zallari family, a branch of the Frashëri family. Zallari studied at the German school of Istanbul and later political science at the University of Vienna. His brother Leonidha Frashëri-Zallari, a collaborator of Mit'hat Frashëri, was a deputy of the Albanian parliament as a representative of Gjirokastër in 1921–23 and 1943–44 and had also served as prefect of Delvinë.

In 1943 as a deputy of Gjirokastër he became a member of the executive committee of the assembly of the State of Albania and a chairman of the assembly on November 9, four days after the previous chairman Idhomene Kosturi was assassinated in Durrës. In 1944 Zallari intervened in the case of the employees of the state radio of Tiranë, who were to be arrested and executed by the German military authorities, which suspected them as Communists, and prevented their arrest. During that period along with other members of the government he was granting Jewish refugees in Albania identification and citizenship as ethnic Albanians in order to prevent their arrest and deportation. These activities had a significant effect in his trial after the war, in which Zallari was sentenced to thirty years in prison. He was released in 1962 and died on 17 March 1976, aged 81.

Ideology 
Throughout his life Zallari was a nationalist and a Germanophile. Zallari viewed imperialism and internationalism as two synonymous views, which represented the extreme opposite of nationalism. He further divided internationalism/imperialism into two forms: secular and religious.

References

Further reading 
Drowned by Banality, Mihal Zallari, 1936
Selected poems

1890s births
1976 deaths
People from Gjirokastër County
20th-century Albanian politicians
Speakers of the Parliament of Albania
Members of the Parliament of Albania
20th-century Albanian historians
Albanian journalists
Albanian anti-communists
20th-century Albanian poets
Albanian nationalists
Albanian expatriates in Egypt
Deutsche Schule Istanbul alumni
Frashëri family
20th-century journalists